Eystrup was a Samtgemeinde ("collective municipality") in the district of Nienburg, in Lower Saxony, Germany. Its seat was in the village Eystrup. On 1 January 2011, it merged with the Samtgemeinde Grafschaft Hoya.

The Samtgemeinde Eystrup consisted of the following municipalities:
 Eystrup
 Gandesbergen 
 Hämelhausen 
 Hassel

Former Samtgemeinden in Lower Saxony